Neurexophilin and PC-esterase domain family member 2 is a protein that in humans is encoded by the NXPE2 gene.

References

Further reading